The 1980 Seattle Seahawks season was the team's fifth season in the National Football League (NFL).
 
The 1980 season was a strange season for the Seattle Seahawks. The team started off 4–3, then lost the remaining nine games of the season. They accumulated four road wins, but lost all eight regular season home games. The offense struggled, especially after losing Sherman Smith to a knee injury for the season. With the running game struggling, the team gave up 52 sacks, up from 23 in 1979. The offense went from 7th to 21st. Even though the defense improved from 27th to 13th, the Seahawks still gave up 405 points.
 
Memorable moments included a 26–7 road win against the Houston Oilers, intercepting Kenny Stabler five times; a 17–16 road win against the Kansas City Chiefs (their last at Arrowhead Stadium until 1990); and a 14–0 road win against the Washington Redskins, with the offense rushing for over 220 yards.

More indicative of the season were the home losses: a week 1 34–13 rout at home inflicted by the San Diego Chargers, a 37–31 loss to the New England Patriots, featuring several lead changes, as the Seattle defense could not hold on; losing to the Kansas City Chiefs 31–30, after going into the 4th quarter with a 23–10 lead, and the Chiefs intercepting Jim Zorn a season-high five times, leading to 17 Kansas City points. The low point of the season was a 27–21 loss to a struggling New York Giants team, one which finished 4–12 (although one was over the Cowboys). On Thanksgiving Day, November 27, the Dallas Cowboys defeated the Seahawks 51–7, in Dallas, but many people believe the Giants loss was worse.

The successes of the 1978 and 1979 seasons were long forgotten by the season's end.

Offseason

NFL Draft

Undrafted free agents

Personnel

Staff

Final roster

     Starters in bold.

Schedule

Preseason

Source: Seahawks Media Guides

Regular season
Divisional matchups have the AFC West playing the NFC East.

Bold indicates division opponents.
Source: 1980 NFL season results

Standings

Game Summaries

Preseason

Week P1: vs. Atlanta Falcons

Week P2: vs. Miami Dolphins

Week P3: at San Francisco 49ers

Week P4: vs. New England Patriots

Regular season

Week 1: vs. San Diego Chargers

Week 2: at Kansas City Chiefs

Week 3: vs. New England Patriots

Week 4: at Washington Redskins

Week 5: at Houston Oilers

Week 6: vs. Cleveland Browns

Week 7: at New York Jets

Week 8: at Oakland Raiders

Week 9: vs. Philadelphia Eagles

Week 10: vs. Kansas City Chiefs

Week 11: vs. Oakland Raiders

Week 12: at Denver Broncos

Week 13: at Dallas Cowboys

Week 14: vs. New York Giants

Week 15: at San Diego Chargers

Week 16: vs. Denver Broncos

References

External links
 Seahawks draft history at NFL.com
 1980 NFL season results at NFL.com

Seattle
Seattle Seahawks seasons